Jonas Geitner (born 24 May 1996) is a German motorcycle racer. He currently races in the IDM Superstock 600 Championship aboard a Kawasaki ZX-6R. He was the IDM Moto3 GP champion in 2015.

Career statistics

Grand Prix motorcycle racing

By season

Races by year

References

External links

Profile on MotoGP.com
Profile on Superbike-IDM.de

1996 births
Living people
German motorcycle racers
Moto3 World Championship riders